Freedom Network may refer to: 

 Freedom Network, an anonymity network controlled by Zero Knowledge Systems from 1997 to 2001
 Freedom Network, a series of HMO health insurance plans by Oxford Health Plans in the New York metropolitan area
 Texas Freedom Network, an activist organization to counter right-wing Christian social doctrine

See also
Network to Freedom